The AAM-N-4 Oriole was an early American air-to-air missile, developed by the Glenn L. Martin Company for the United States Navy. Designed for launch from carrier-based aircraft, the missile programme was cancelled before flight testing began, and the missiles produced were utilized as test vehicles.

Design and development
Development of the AAM-N-4 Oriole began in 1947, when a development contract was awarded by the United States Navy's Bureau of Ordnance to the Glenn L. Martin Company to develop a heavy air-to-air missile, utilizing active radar homing for fire and forget operation, for launch from aircraft operating from aircraft carriers. Flight speed was originally intended to be above Mach 3.

In 1948, the Oriole contract was redefined to be a guidance development program instead of a project to develop an operational missile; the program to construct test vehicles resumed in 1950 for research and development purposes, the missiles being redesignated RTV-N-16. Flight testing began shortly thereafter at the Naval Air Missile Test Center at Point Mugu, California; testing continued through 1953, with 56 flight tests being conducted throughout the program; as built the missile proved to be capable of Mach 2.5. The Oriole program was terminated at the end of 1953.

References

Citations

Bibliography

AAM-N-004
Abandoned military rocket and missile projects of the United States
Military equipment introduced in the 1950s